Lambert Fick (born 21 January 1959) is a South African cricketer. He played in one List A and eight first-class matches for Boland in 1982/83 and 1983/84.

See also
 List of Boland representative cricketers

References

External links
 

1959 births
Living people
South African cricketers
Boland cricketers